Sinatra: All or Nothing at All is an American documentary film that premiered in two parts on April 5 and 6, 2015 on HBO.

Production

Development
On January 8, 2015, HBO announced at the annual Television Critics Association's winter press tour that they would air a new documentary from director Alex Gibney about the life of singer and actor Frank Sinatra, entitled Sinatra: All or Nothing at All.

On January 22, 2015, it was announced that the film would premiere in two parts on April 5 and 6, 2015.

Release

Marketing
On March 6, 2015, HBO released the documentary's official trailer.

Premiere
On March 31, 2015, the film held its official premiere at the Time Warner Center in New York City, New York.

Reception
Sinatra: All or Nothing at All has been met with a positive response from critics. On the review aggregation website Rotten Tomatoes, the film holds a 93% approval rating with an average rating of 6.93/10, based on 15 reviews. Metacritic, which uses a weighted average, assigned the season a score of 74 out of 100 based on 11 critics, indicating "generally favorable reviews".

References

External links
Sinatra: All or Nothing at All at Jigsaw Productions

2015 films
HBO documentary films
Films directed by Alex Gibney
2010s English-language films
2010s American films